Ysis (Isis) Lenis Barreto Rodríguez (born March 27, 1980 in Caracas) is a judoka from Venezuela.

Early and personal life
Barreto was born in Caracas and began judo when she was 13 years old.

She is member of Judo Anzoátegui club in Barcelona (Venezuela)

After the 2008 Summer Olympics in Beijing, she wanted to retire, but decided against it. She said in an interview that she would like to compete at 2012 Olympic Games in London, but that "it won't be possible without a good trainer."

Judo career
Barreto won the silver medal of the under 70 kg division of the 2006 Central American and Caribbean Games.

At the 2008 Summer Olympics in Beijing in first match, she stood against Senegalese Cécile Hane and won. Her second match was against the Japanese Olympic Champion from Athens, Ayumi Tanimoto. She had tried various techniques, but the skilled Japanese judoka always countered it. Ayumi waited for her moment, which came after two minutes into the match. She took Barreto and held her for 25 seconds. Barreto lost by ippon (Yoko-shiho-gatame). She won her third match.

Achievements

References

External links
 
 
 NBC

1980 births
Living people
Venezuelan female judoka
Judoka at the 2008 Summer Olympics
Judoka at the 2011 Pan American Games
Pan American Games medalists in judo
Pan American Games bronze medalists for Venezuela
Central American and Caribbean Games silver medalists for Venezuela
Central American and Caribbean Games bronze medalists for Venezuela
Competitors at the 2006 Central American and Caribbean Games
Competitors at the 2010 Central American and Caribbean Games
South American Games bronze medalists for Venezuela
South American Games medalists in judo
Competitors at the 2010 South American Games
Olympic judoka of Venezuela
Central American and Caribbean Games medalists in judo
Sportspeople from Caracas